Yvonne Darlene Cagle (born April 24, 1959) is an American physician, professor, retired U.S. Air Force Colonel, and former NASA Astronaut. Cagle joined NASA as an astronaut in 1996. She is one of six African American female astronauts.

Education
Born in West Point, New York, Yvonne Cagle graduated from Novato High School in Novato, California. She received her bachelor's degree in biochemistry from San Francisco State University in 1981, and a doctor of medicine degree from the University of Washington in 1985. She completed a transitional internship at Highland General Hospital in Oakland, California in 1985 and received a certificate in Aerospace Medicine from the School of Aerospace Medicine at Brooks Air Force Base, Texas, in 1988. She then went on to complete a residency in family practice at Ghent FP at Eastern Virginia Medical School in 1992 and received certification as a senior aviation medical examiner from the Federal Aviation Administration in 1995.

U.S. Air Force
Cagle retired from the United States Air Force with the rank of Colonel in 2008. In May 1989 as a commissioned medical officer assigned to the 48th Tactical Hospital, United Kingdom, Cagle served as Air Force Medical Liaison Officer for STS-30 mission to test the Magellan spacecraft, before she became a NASA astronaut. She worked as medical doctor at NASA's Occupational Health Clinic from 1994 to 1996. In 1996 she was selected for astronaut training by NASA.

Astronaut career
Yvonne Cagle was a member of the Astronaut Class of 1996 (NASA Astronaut Group 16).
Cagle is also an advisor for NASA's Flight Opportunities Program (originally named CRuSR – Commercial Reusable Suborbital Research Program). Currently Dr. Cagle is on faculty and serves as the NASA liaison for exploration and space development with Singularity University. During the workshop, Dr. Cagle was embedded with the crew as a crew training consultant and advisor, providing insights and feedback to both crew and study team from the viewpoint of an astronaut, flight surgeon, space development expert, and science liaison.

In 2013, she was selected as part of the reserve crew for Hawai'i Space Exploration Analog and Simulation (HI-SEAS), which is part of a study for NASA to determine the best way to keep astronauts well nourished during multiple-year missions to Mars or the moon. Furthermore, Dr. Cagle is also listed as an honorary member of the Danish Astronautical Society.

In 2014, Cagle was a visiting professor to Fordham University where she was participating in interdisciplinary research in health, environment and human Performance.  She was  awarded  an  honorary  Ph.D.  by  Fordham  University  for  her substantial  and  significant  contributions  to  the  fields  of  science,  technology  and  human  health.

Cagle never flew on a space mission, and as of no later than June 2017 was deemed a NASA Management Astronaut, which means that she is employed at NASA but is no longer eligible for spaceflight assignments; she still appears on the active list of NASA Management Astronauts as of January 2021, assigned to NASA's Ames Research Center in Mountain View, California, in addition to her previously mentioned work as a professor and visiting professor.

Post-NASA Career 
Cagle served as the VP for space exploration and space exponential technologies at Singularity University and acted as a Visiting Professor at Fordham University. She holds adjunct professorships with Stanford University, UC Davis, and UTMB, Galveston.

Awards and honors 
Cagle has received numerous awards and recognition including Outstanding Young Women of America; National Defense Service Medal; Air Force Achievement Medal; U.S. Air Force Air Staff Exceptional Physician Commendation; National Technical Association Distinguished Scientist Award; Commendation Marin County Board of Supervisors; Commendation Novato School Board; Honorary Ph.D. in Humanities, Fordham University; Honorary appointment, University of Wisconsin-Madison.

Other
In 2017, she brought Katherine Johnson onto the stage at the Academy Awards.

Cagle was a TEDx speaker in 2018 on the subject of "Poetry of space on Earth".

See also
 List of African-American astronauts
 HI-SEAS

References

Further reading

External links
 Spacefacts biography of Yvonne Cagle
 Mars Habitat Food Study in Hawaii
Poetry of Space on Earth | Yvonne Cagle Ph.D. | TEDxSanFrancisco

1959 births
Living people
American astronauts
Physician astronauts
Women astronauts
HI-SEAS
People from West Point, New York
San Francisco State University alumni
University of Washington School of Medicine alumni
Eastern Virginia Medical School alumni
African-American women aviators
American women aviators
African-American aviators
21st-century African-American people
21st-century African-American women
20th-century African-American people
20th-century African-American women